Anthrax Island may refer to one of three sites for hazardous biological disease testing:

 Gruinard Island, a Scottish island in the UK used in World War II
 Vozrozhdeniya Island, in the Aral Sea, used by the Soviet Union in the Cold War
 Plum Island (New York), off Long Island, New York in the US, the location of a testing lab for hazardous livestock diseases